Wedding Worries is a 1941 Our Gang short comedy film directed by Edward Cahn. It was the 202nd Our Gang short (203rd episode, 114th talking short, 115th talking episode, and 34th MGM produced episode) that was released.

Plot
Having read horror stories about wicked stepmothers, the gang is determined to break up the marriage between Darla Hood's widowed father and his new bride. Never bothering to find out, as Darla has, that the second Mrs. Hood is a wonderful woman, the kids pull off all sorts of pranks at the wedding ceremony, from playing the radio too loud to releasing a cylinder of laughing gas. The wedding guests start smiling then laughing as the gas fills the room. Someone in the building discovers what they're doing and shuts off the canister. The wedding is temporarily postponed and the gang is sentenced to a spanking, assembly-line style.

Cast

The Gang
 Mickey Gubitosi as Mickey
 Darla Hood as Darla Hood
 Billy Laughlin as Froggy
 George McFarland as Spanky
 Billie Thomas as Buckwheat

Additional cast
 Barbara Bedford as Miss Douglas
 Margaret Bert as Delia the housekeeper
 Chester Clute as Judge Martin
 Sid D'Albrook as Mickey's father
 Ben Hall as Froggy's father
 William Irving as Guest
 Jack Lipson as Guest
 Stanley Logan as Father of the bride
 Byron Shores as Dr. James B. Hood
 Joe Young as Best man

Notability
Wedding Worries marked the final appearance of Our Gang leading lady Darla Hood, after six years of service.

See also
 Our Gang filmography

References

External links
 
 

1941 films
1941 comedy films
American black-and-white films
Films directed by Edward L. Cahn
Metro-Goldwyn-Mayer short films
Our Gang films
1941 short films
1940s American films
1940s English-language films